The Chiesa della Madonna della Porta is a Roman Catholic church in Racconigi, Province of Cuneo, region of Piedmont, Italy.

History
The church was erected and dedicated to the Madonna in gratitude for the cessation of the plague epidemic in 1630–31 that killed nearly a quarter of the inhabitants. Residents seeking protection prayed to an icon of the Virgin found near the gate of the city. The fresco was replaced by a painting. In the late 17th century, when the walls were torn down, a church was erected at the site to shelter the image, patronized by Giovanni Angelo Spada, his coat of arms is in the presbytery. The church housed the Compagnia delle Umiliate, a flagellant confraternity.

In 1700, Giovanni Battista Pozzo painted 8 canvases for the church of which six remain:
 Birth of the Virgin
 Presentation of Mary at the Temple
 Adoration of the Magi
 Flight to Egypt 
 Marriage of the Virgin
 Circumcision
The main altarpiece was painted in 1631. The ceiling has elaborate 18th-century stucco decoration.

References

Roman Catholic churches in Racconigi
18th-century Roman Catholic church buildings in Italy